Alberto Cirilo Contrera Giménez (born 14 February 1992) is a Paraguayan professional footballer who plays as a midfielder for River Plate.

Career

Club
Contrera's career began with Olimpia. He made his professional debut during the 2009 Paraguayan Primera División season, before scoring his first goals in a 0–3 win versus 3 de Febrero during 2010. He went on to score three goals in thirty-nine appearances in his first four seasons with Olimpia. In July 2012, Contrera was loaned to Rubio Ñu. One goal in fourteen matches followed. He returned to Olimpia for the 2013 campaign, eventually making six further appearances for the club. Contrera departed on loan again in 2013 to join fellow Paraguayan Primera División team Sportivo Luqueño.

After fourteen matches for Sportivo Luqueño in 2013, Contrera left Olimpia to spend 2014 with General Díaz. He marked his second start for General Díaz with two goals in a 3–2 win against 12 de Octubre on 15 August. On 1 January 2015, Guaraní signed Contrera. He scored five goals in twenty-five appearances in his debut season as Guaraní finished second. In his first three seasons with the club, Contrera netted eight goals in fifty-six games. July 2017 saw Contrera leave Paraguayan football for the first time to play in Argentina with Patronato on loan. His first match came versus San Martín on 27 August.

International
Contrera won three caps for the Paraguay U20s at the 2011 South American U-20 Championship in Peru, the first of which arrived during a 4–2 defeat to Brazil on 17 January 2011.

Career statistics
.

Honours
Olimpia
Paraguayan Primera División: 2011 Clausura

Guaraní
Paraguayan Primera División: 2016 Clausura

References

External links

1992 births
Living people
Sportspeople from Asunción
Paraguayan footballers
Paraguay under-20 international footballers
Association football midfielders
Paraguayan expatriate footballers
Expatriate footballers in Argentina
Paraguayan expatriate sportspeople in Argentina
Paraguayan Primera División players
Argentine Primera División players
Club Olimpia footballers
Club Rubio Ñu footballers
Sportivo Luqueño players
General Díaz footballers
Club Guaraní players
Club Atlético Patronato footballers
River Plate (Asunción) footballers